Leonard Kibera (1942- 1983) was a Kenyan novelist and short story writer, famous for his works Voices in the Dark (1970) and Potent Ash (1968) (Short Stories). He was awarded third prize in the African drama contest by the British Broadcasting Company (BBC) in 1967 for his contributions to African literature.

Life 
Leonard Kibera was born in Kenya on the 8th of October 1942 in the family of Elizabeth Nduta and James Kibera and three other siblings. Leonard’s career was fully devoted to writing with his most famous works being Voices in the Dark (1970) and Potent Ash (1968).

Post High School 
After graduating high school at Embu, Leonard studied at the University of California and at Stanford University.

Later in his life, from 1976 he taught at the University of Zambia and the Kenyatta University in Kenya until his passing.

Influences 
Kibera was influenced by Ngugi’s sense of relationship, and concerns regarding the modern compared to cultural traditions of the past.

At the University of Nairobi, Kibera was an undergraduate pupil, mentored by Ngugi. A major difference between the works of the two is the fact that the protagonists of Kibera are often rebellious or misfits.

References 

1942 births
1983 deaths